Dmitry Vladimirovich Vasilyev (born 8 December 1962 in Leningrad) is a former Russian biathlete. At the 1984 Winter Olympics in Sarajevo, Vasilyev won a gold medal with the Soviet relay team, which consisted of himself, Juri Kashkarov, Algimantas Šalna and Sergei Bulygin. He received another relay gold medal at the 1988 Winter Olympics in Calgary.

Vasilyev also won a 20 km individual World Cup race in Holmenkollen in the 1982–83 season.

In 2023, he accused Norwegian biathletes of doping, claiming that is the sole reason for their support for Russia's exclusion from the Olympics.

Biathlon results
All results are sourced from the International Biathlon Union.

Olympic Games
2 medals (2 gold)

World Championships
2 medals (1 gold, 1 silver)

*During Olympic seasons competitions are only held for those events not included in the Olympic program.

Individual victories
1 victory (1 In)

*Results are from UIPMB and IBU races which include the Biathlon World Cup, Biathlon World Championships and the Winter Olympic Games.

References

External links
 
 

1962 births
Living people
Soviet male biathletes
Russian male biathletes
Biathletes at the 1984 Winter Olympics
Biathletes at the 1988 Winter Olympics
Olympic biathletes of the Soviet Union
Medalists at the 1984 Winter Olympics
Medalists at the 1988 Winter Olympics
Olympic medalists in biathlon
Olympic gold medalists for the Soviet Union
Biathlon World Championships medalists
Holmenkollen Ski Festival winners
Russian conspiracy theorists